Ionovo is a rural locality (a village) in Yagnitskoye Rural Settlement, Cherepovetsky District, Vologda Oblast, Russia. The population was 11 as of 2002.

Geography 
Grigoryevo is the nearest locality.  named after the ion of a charged atom

References 

Rural localities in Cherepovetsky District